"" is the tenth single by Mr. Children, released by Toy's Factory on February 5, 1996. The cover of the single is Kazutoshi Sakurai's face whose tongue was written "no name". "Namonaki Uta" was used as the theme song of Japanese television drama Pure.

On the Japanese Oricon weekly chart, the single "Namonaki Uta" opened at number-one with the first week sales of over 1.208 million copies, establishing the Japanese highest first-week single sales record. It topped the 1996 Oricon yearly single charts and sold over 2.308 million copies in total. It is the second best-selling song for the band behind their 1994 single "Tomorrow Never Knows."

The song was covered by Kohmi Hirose on her 2010 album Drama Songs.

Track listing

References

1996 singles
Oricon Weekly number-one singles
Mr. Children songs
Japanese television drama theme songs
Songs written by Kazutoshi Sakurai
1996 songs
Toy's Factory singles